Lauren Davis defeated Elisabetta Cocciaretto in the final, 7–6(7–0), 6–2 to win the singles tennis title at the 2023 Hobart International. She won the title as a qualifier. It was her first WTA Tour title since 2017, and she did not drop a set en route, including in the qualifying rounds.

Elena Rybakina was the reigning champion from when the event was last held in 2020, but chose to compete in Adelaide instead.

Seeds

Draw

Finals

Top half

Bottom half

Qualifying

Seeds

Qualifiers

Lucky loser

Qualifying draw

First qualifier

Second qualifier

Third qualifier

Fourth qualifier

Fifth qualifier

Sixth qualifier

References

External links
 Main draw
 Qualifying draw

Hobart International
Singles